The Chief Secretary Khyber Pakhtunkhwa, also referred to as CS KP, is the bureaucratic chief and highest-ranking official of the Government of Khyber Pakhtunkhwa. The appointment of the Chief Secretary is made directly by the Prime Minister of Pakistan. The position of Chief Secretary is equivalent to the rank of Federal Secretary and the position holder usually belongs to the Pakistan Administrative Service.

The Chief Secretary is the province's administrative boss as all administrative secretaries report to him. The CS in turn reports to the Chief Minister of Khyber Pakhtunkhwa, however the Chief Secretary is not under the charge of the Chief Minister as only the Prime Minister can appoint or remove the CS from his position. The Chief Secretary also serves as the Chief Advisor to the Chief Minister and as Secretary to the provincial Cabinet.

List of chief secretaries
The following table lists the names of chief secretaries who have remained in office since March 1997.

See also
 Federal Secretary
 Pakistan Administrative Service
 Establishment Secretary of Pakistan
 Cabinet Secretary of Pakistan
 Chief Secretary Sindh
 Chief Secretary Balochistan
 Chief Secretary Punjab
 Chief Secretary (Pakistan)

References

Government of Khyber Pakhtunkhwa
Pakistani government officials
Chief Secretary Khyber Pakhtunkhwa